is a Japanese voice actor, narrator and singer who is the head of Axlone, a voice acting company he founded in April 2011. His name is sometimes, although incorrectly, transliterated as Tomoyuki Morikawa. In 2003, he and Fumihiko Tachiki formed the band "2Hearts", one of their works being the ending theme of the video game Dynasty Warriors 4: Empires. He has voiced many characters in anime and video games, including Yoshikage Kira in JoJo's Bizarre Adventure: Diamond Is Unbreakable, Kengo Akechi in Kindaichi Case Files, Sephiroth in the Final Fantasy series and Kingdom Hearts series, Dante in Devil May Cry, Kagaya Ubuyashiki in Demon Slayer: Kimetsu no Yaiba, Isshin Kurosaki in Bleach, Minato Namikaze in Naruto: Shippuden, Julius Novachrono in Black Clover, Mard Geer Tartaros in Fairy Tail, Eizen in Tales of Berseria, Boros in One Punch Man, both Eneru, Hatchan and Scopper Gaban in One Piece, Tyki Mikk in D.Gray-man, Naraku in Inuyasha, Griffith in the 1997 series of Berserk, Isaburo Sasaki in Gin Tama and the main and titular character of Tekkaman Blade. He attended Katsuta Voice Actor's Academy with Kotono Mitsuishi, Chisa Yokoyama, Wataru Takagi, Sachiko Sugawara, and Michiko Neya. Because of his deep voice, he is often cast as an imposing character. He is the current official dub-over artist of Tom Cruise and Ewan McGregor.

Filmography

Television animation
1992
Kouryu Densetsu Villgust – Kui
Tekkaman Blade – Takaya Aiba/Tekkaman Blade (debut role)
Nangoku Shōnen Papuwa-kun – Kintaro
Tekkaman Blade – Aiba Takaya "D-Boy"/Tekkaman Blade
1993
Ghost Sweeper Mikami – Peter
Mobile Suit Victory Gundam – Kill Tandon, Kuffu Salomon, Metchet Rubence
Slam Dunk – Yohei Mito, Toki Kuwata, Kazuo Araki, Nobunaga Kiyota
Aoki Densetsu Shoot! – Kamiya Atsushi
Yu Yu Hakusho – Shishiwakamaru
1994
Brave Police J-Decker – Duke/Duke Fire
1995
The Brave of Gold Goldran – Walter Walzac/Eta Izak
Mobile Suit Gundam Wing – Otto
Key the Metal Idol – Shuuichi Tataki
Juuni Senshi Bakuretsu Eto Ranger – Pochirō, Hols
Virtua Fighter – The Animation – Onimaru
Juuni Senshi Bakuretsu Eto Ranger – Pochirō, Hols
Saint Tail – Manato Sawatari
1996
After War Gundam X – Shagia Frost
Detective Conan – Shukichi Haneda
Martian Successor Nadesico – Genichiro Tsukiomi
Slayers NEXT – Keith Balzac
1997
Anime Ganbare Goemon – Seppukumaru
Kindaichi Case Files – Kengo Akechi
Berserk – Griffith
Pocket Monsters – Haunter, Bruno, Wallace
1998
Flint the Time Detective – Wolfgang Amadeus Mozart
Yu-Gi-Oh! – Katsuya Jonouchi
Mamotte Shugogetten – Miyauchi Izumo
2000
Descendants of Darkness – Tatsumi Seiichiro
Digimon Adventure 02 – Haruhiko Takenouchi, Yukio Oikawa, Mummymon, Vamdemon, BelialVamdemon
Baby Felix - Professor Tojo
Hajime no Ippo – Alexander Volg Zangief
One Piece – Hatchan
Saiyuki – Homura
2001
Inuyasha – Naraku; succeeding Hiroshi Yanaka
Fighting Spirit – Alexander Volg Zangief
X – Aoki Seiichiro
2002
King of Bandit Jing – Master Gear
Kinnikuman Nisei – Terry the Kid
Monkey Typhoon – Saitosu
Tokyo Mew Mew – Ron Yuebing
2003
Full Metal Panic? Fumoffu – Atsunobu Hayashimizu
Last Exile – Alex Row
One Piece – Enel
Saint Beast – Seiryuu no Gou
F-Zero GP Legend – Ryu Suzaku (Rick Wheeler)
Last Exile: Fam, the Silver Wing – Alex Row
Peacemaker Kurogane – Ryunosuke Ichimura
2004
Bleach – Isshin Kurosaki, Tsubaki, Kaname Tōsen
Madlax – Carrossea Doon
Kyo Kara Maoh! – Conrad Weller
Harukanaru Toki no Naka De – Nue
Initial D: Fourth Stage – Daiki Ninomiya
Tenjho Tenge – Takayanagi Mitsuomi
Inuyasha – Onigumo; Episode 148
2005
Naruto – Kimimaro Kaguya
Damekko Dōbutsu – Yunihiko
Gallery Fake – Reiji Fujita
Genesis of Aquarion – Touma
Glass Mask – Masumi Hayami
Speed Grapher – Chouji Suitengu
Sukisho – Ryouya Kozuki
Otogi-Jushi Akazukin – Jedo
Shuffle! – King of Devils
Super Robot Wars Original Generation: The Animation – Kyosuke Nanbu
2006
Black Lagoon – Mr. Chang
D.Gray-man – Tyki Mikk
Gakuen Heaven – Hideaki Nakajima
Futari wa Pretty Cure Splash Star – Gooyan
Nana – Takumi Ichinose
Night Head Genesis – Naoto Kirihara
Saiunkoku Monogatari – Shuuei Ran
Shōnen Onmyōji – Seiryū
Super Robot Wars Original Generation: Divine Wars – Kyosuke Nanbu
2007
Devil May Cry – Dante
El Cazador de la Bruja – Roberto
Maze – Chic
Nodame Cantabile – Jean Donnadeiu
Zombie Loan – Bekkō
2008
Allison & Lillia – Travas
Casshern Sins – Dio
2009
Rideback – Kiefer
InuYasha Kanketsu-Hen – Naraku
The Melancholy of Haruhi Suzumiya – Yutaka Tamaru
Hanasakeru Seishōnen – Lee-leng Huang
Sengoku Basara: Samurai Kings series – Katakura Kojūrō
2010
Naruto: Shippuden – Minato Namikaze
Panty & Stocking with Garterbelt – Tom Croose
Super Robot Wars Original Generation: The Inspector – Kyosuke Nanbu
2011
Deadman Wonderland – Azuma Genkaku
Itsuka Tenma no Kuro Usagi – Seraphim (Male voice)
Marvel Anime: Wolverine – Cyclops
Toriko – "Knocking Master" Jiro
Sekai-ichi Hatsukoi – Ryūichirō Isaka
Metal Fight Beyblade 4D – Rago / Nemesis
Marvel Anime – Cyclops/Scott Summers
2012
Aesthetica of a Rogue Hero – Dark Lord Galius
Brave 10 – Yukimura Sanada
Gintama – Sasaki Isaburo
Hyōka – Muneyoshi Kugayama
Kingdom – Ri Boku
LINE TOWN – Moon
Magi: The Labyrinth of Magic – Ugo
Robotics;Notes – Kō Kimajima
2013
Shirokuma Café – Panda-Mama
Cuticle Detective Inaba – Kuniharu Ogino
Hajime no Ippo: Rising – Alexander Volg Zangief
2014
Bakumatsu Rock – Toshizō Hijikata
Buddy Complex – Alfried Gallant
Buddy Complex Kanketsu-hen: Ano Sora ni Kaeru Mirai de – Alfried Gallant
Captain Earth – Taiyou Manatsu
Gundam Reconguista in G – Cahill Saint
Kamigami no Asobi – Thoth Caduceus
Strange+ – Ozu
Sword Art Online II – Seijirou Kikuoka
Sengoku Basara: End of Judgement – Katakura Kojūrō
2015
Durarara!!x2 – Igor
Hokuto no Ken: Ichigo Aji – Shin
Junjou Romantica – Ryuichiro Isaka
Ninja Slayer From Animation – Fujikido Kenji / Ninja Slayer
One-Punch Man – Boros
Diabolik Lovers, More Blood – Carla Tsukinami
2016
Danganronpa 3: The End of Kibōgamine Gakuen – Kyosuke Munakata
Taboo Tattoo – Brad Blackstone
Fairy Tail – Mard Geer Tartaros
Joker Game – Amari
Macross Delta – Arad Mölders
JoJo's Bizarre Adventure: Diamond Is Unbreakable – Yoshikage Kira, "Kosaku Kawajiri"
Crayon Shin-chan – Hiroshi Nohara (stand-in for Keiji Fujiwara)
Bungou Stray Dogs – Edgar Allan Poe
2017
Black Clover – Julius Novachrono
Oushitsu Kyoushi Haine – Viktor von Glanzreich
Star-Myu: High School Star Musical 2 – Asaki Uozumi
Welcome to the Ballroom – Kaname Sengoku
Made in Abyss – Bondrewd
Sengoku Night Blood – Nobunaga Oda
The Ancient Magus' Bride – Simon Kalm
Rin-ne – Otobe (Episode 70)
2018
6 Lovers – Kagami Keiichi
A Certain Magical Index III – Fiamma of The Right
Banana Fish – Blanca
Black Clover – Julius Nova Chrono
Mr. Tonegawa: Middle Management Blues – Yukio Tonegawa
Lord of Vermilion: The Crimson King – Akaya Inuki
2019
Black Clover – Julius Nova Chrono
Meiji Tokyo Renka – Charlie
Demon Slayer: Kimetsu no Yaiba – Kagaya Ubuyashiki
Ultramarine Magmell – Shūin
Star-Myu: High School Star Musical 3 - Asaki Uozumi
Over Drive Girl 1/6 – Ozma
Wise Man's Grandchild – Oliver Schtrom
Fruits Basket – Kazuma Soma
Special 7: Special Crime Investigation Unit – Sakon Zeroemon "Boss" Kiryūin
Assassins Pride – Oyagi
2020
Black Clover – Julius Nova Chrono
Kingdom 3 – Ri Boku
Komatta Jii-san – Narrator
Marudase Kintarō – Kintarō
Shadowverse – Leon Auransh
2021
Hortensia Saga – Jim McNeil, Adel
Mushoku Tensei: Jobless Reincarnation – Paul Greyrat
Seven Knights Revolution: Hero Successor – Chris
One Piece – Scopper Gaban
Digimon Ghost Game – Aviel Kyogoku/Vandemon (Episode 25)
So I'm a Spider, So What? – Potimas Harrifenas
Peach Boy Riverside – Hiko
Doraemon – Communications Officer of the Dorayaki Planet (Doraemon Birthday Special 2021)
Fena: Pirate Princess – Abel Bluefield
The World's Finest Assassin Gets Reincarnated in Another World as an Aristocrat – Cian
Platinum End – Nanato Mukaido
2022
A Couple of Cuckoos – Sōichirō Amano
Made in Abyss: The Golden City of the Scorching Sun – Bondrewd
Eternal Boys – Daisuke Yamanaka
Bleach: Thousand-Year Blood War – Isshin Kurosaki, Kaname Tōsen
2023
Buddy Daddies – Kyūtarō Kugi
Giant Beasts of Ars – Jiiro
High Card – Greg Young
My Hero Academia 6 – Hikage Shinomori
The Marginal Service – Zeno Stokes

Original net animation (ONA)
The King of Fighters: Destiny (2017) – Jeff Bogard
Obsolete (2019) – Miyajima
Cagaster of an Insect Cage (2020) – Mario
Resident Evil: Infinite Darkness (2021) – Leon S. Kennedy
Tekken: Bloodline (2022) – Hwoarang

Original video animation (OVA)
801 T.T.S. Airbats (1994) – Akizuki Kazuaki
Battle Skipper (1995) – Todo
Final Fantasy VII Advent Children (2005) – Sephiroth
Haru wo Daiteita (2005) – Iwaki Kyousuke
Kenichi: The Mightiest Disciple (2014) – Christopher Eclair
Kirepapa (2008) – Takatsukasa Chihiro
Last Order: Final Fantasy VII (2005) – Sephiroth
Moldiver (1993) – Hiroshi Ozora
Mudazumo Naki Kaikaku (2010) – Koizumi Junichiro
Otaku no Video (1991) – Iiyama
Please Save My Earth (1993) – Jinpachi Ogura
Princess Rouge (1997) – Raiga
Tales of Phantasia: The Animation (2006) – Dhaos
Tales of Symphonia: The Animation (2007) – Yuan
Tekkaman Blade II (1994) – Aiba Takaya "D-Boy"/Tekkaman Blade
Tenshi Nanka Ja Nai (1994) – Akira Sudô
Tokyo Revelation (1995) – Yousuke Miura
Ultraman: Super Fighter Legend (1996) – Ultraman
Wild Adapter (2002) – Kubota Makoto
Close the Last Door (2007) – Honda Kenzou
Winter Cicada (2007) – Keiichirou Akizuki
Kaitō Queen wa Circus ga Osuki (2022) – White Face

Theatrical animation
Doraemon: Nobita and the Galaxy Super-express – Custodian
Tenchi Muyo! in Love – Young Nobuyuki Masaki
Inuyasha the Movie: The Castle Beyond the Looking Glass – Naraku
Konjiki no Gash Bell!! Movie 1: Unlisted Demon 101 – Wiseman
Final Fantasy VII: Advent Children – Sephiroth
Bleach: Memories of Nobody – Isshin Kurosaki
Vexille – Kisaragi
Bleach: The DiamondDust Rebellion – Isshin Kurosaki
King of Thorn – Marco Owen
Naruto Shippuden The Movie: The Lost Tower – Minato Namikaze
Fullmetal Alchemist: The Sacred Star of Milos – Atlas, Melvin Voyager
Sengoku Basara: The Last Party – Katakura Kojuro
Road to Ninja: Naruto the Movie – Minato Namikaze
Resident Evil: Damnation – Leon S. Kennedy
Space Pirate Captain Harlock – Isora
Saint Seiya: Legend of Sanctuary – Sagittarius Aioros
Gekijōban Meiji Tokyo Renka: Yumihari no Serenade – Charlie
Ajin: Shōtotsu – Almeyda
Crayon Shin-chan: Invasion!! Alien Shiriri – Hiroshi Nohara
Resident Evil: Vendetta – Leon S. Kennedy
Crayon Shin-chan: Burst Serving! Kung Fu Boys ~Ramen Rebellion~ – Hiroshi Nohara
Batman Ninja – Two-Face
Even if the World Will End Tomorrow – Shū Izumi
Crayon Shin-chan: Honeymoon Hurricane ~The Lost Hiroshi~ – Hiroshi Nohara
The Saga of Tanya the Evil: The Movie – William Douglas Drake
The Royal Tutor – Viktor von Glanzreich
My Tyrano: Together, Forever (2020)
Made in Abyss: Dawn of the Deep Soul (2020) – Bondrewd
Detective Conan: The Scarlet Bullet – Shukichi Haneda
Belle (2021) – Justin
Crayon Shin-chan: Shrouded in Mystery! The Flowers of Tenkazu Academy (2021) – Hiroshi Nohara
Isekai Quartet The Movie -Another World- (2022) – Alec Hoshin
Toku Touken Ranbu: Hanamaru ~Setsugetsuka~ (2022) – Onimaru Kunitsuna

Tokusatsu
Zyuden Sentai Kyoryuger (2013-2014) – Wise God Torin (eps. 1 - 32, 34 - 48)/Kyouryu Silver (eps. 36 - 45) (Voice)/Torii (ep. 43) (Actor), Demon Sword Priest Mad Torin (ep. 36, 46) (Voice)
Zyuden Sentai Kyoryuger: Gaburincho of Music (August 3, 2013) – Wise God Torin
Zyuden Sentai Kyoryuger vs. Go-Busters: The Great Dinosaur Battle! Farewell Our Eternal Friends (January 18, 2014) – Wise God Torin / Kyouryu Silver
Zyuden Sentai Kyoryuger Returns: Hundred Years After (June 20, 2014) – Origin Wise God Torin / Kyouryu Silver
Ressha Sentai ToQger vs. Kyoryuger: The Movie (January 18, 2015) – Torin
Power Rangers Dino Force Brave (2017 Japan) – Torin
Kamen rider: Beyond Generation - Khufu Crisper

Drama CDs
Abunai series 3: Abunai Bara to Yuri no Sono – Izumi Sudou
Datte Maou-Sama wa kare ga Kirai-Kamiko
Abunai series 4: Abunai Campus Love – Takesaki
Abunai series 5: Abunai Shiawase Chou Bangaihen – Izumi Sudou, Toshiyuki Oosawa
Adult Education: Shinshi Chokyo – Tomoe Kyouishi
Akuma no Himitsu – Zahan
Aiso Tsukashi – Kyousuke Sawaragi
Aitsu to Scandal series 1 – Kimichika Kotobuki
Aitsu to Scandal series 2: Houkago wa Scandal – Kimichika Kotobuki
Aitsu to Scandal series 3: Gakuensai wa Scandal – Kimichika Kotobuki
Analyst no Yuutsu series 2: Koi no Risk wa Hansenai – Jeffery S Willis
Analyst no Yuutsu series 3: Yuuwaku no Target Price – Jeffery S Willis
Analyst no Yuutsu series 5: Ai no Rating AAA – Jeffery S Willis
Answer series 1 – Takaaki Mashiba
Answer series 2: Suggestion – Takaaki Mashiba
Ao no Kiseki series 1: Ao no Kiseki – Sanshirou
Ao no Kiseki series 2: Catharsis Spell – Sanshirou
Ao no Kiseki series 3: Crystal Crown – Sanshirou
Ao no Kiseki series 4: Baroque Pearl – Sanshirou
Ao no Kiseki series 5: Persona Non Grata – Sanshirou
Ao no Kiseki series 6: Phantom Pain – Sanshirou
Bad Boys! – Eikichi Yazaki
Boku no Gingitsune – Rei Akitsushima
Boku no Mono ni Narinasai series 2: Kimi no Tonaride Nemurasete – Kageaki Uesugi
Boku no Mono ni Narinasai series 3: Ikeru Tokomade Ikouyo – Kageaki Uesugi
Boku no Mono ni Narinasai series 4: Kitto Junai Toiunowa... – Kageaki Uesugi
Boku no Koe – Hideyumi Kurosawa
Catch Me! – Kouichi Takahara
Close the Last Door – Kenzo Honda
Corsair series – Ayace Malik
Damasaretai – Rihito Katase
Devil May Cry: The Animated Series – Dante
Ecstasy wa Eien ni ~Utsukushiki Rougoku~ – Hiraiwa
Eden wo Tooku ni Hanarete series 1: Kami yo, Izuko no Rakuen – Masaomi Katou
Eden wo Tooku ni Hanarete series 2: Ryokuin no Rakuen – Masaomi Katou
Eden wo Tooku ni Hanarete series 3: Setsunai Yoru no Rakuen – Masaomi Katou
Embracing Love – Kyosuke Iwaki
Endless series – Yuuri Masaki
Executive Boy – Kyouichirou Mayumura
Gaki no Ryoubun series 2: Hasumi Koukou – Kazumasa Mutou
Gaki no Ryoubun series 3: Saikyou Hiiruzu – Kazumasa Mutou
Gaki no Ryoubun series 4: Uwasa no Shinzui – Kazumasa Mutou
Gaki no Ryoubun series 5: Akuun no Jouken – Kazumasa Mutou
Gakuen Heaven – Hideaki Nakajima
Gerard & Jacques – GerardGin no Requiem – LucianHappy Time – Tokimune TatsumiHana Wa Saku Ka – Sakurai KazuakiHonoka na Koi no Danpen wo – YunagiInto Your Heart Through the Door – Kenzo HondaJigoku Meguri – Enma the 2ndJounetsu no Young Man – HidenoriKedamono series – Kazuaki MuraseKiken ga Ippai – Chiya ShimazuKimi to Te wo Tsunaide – Takahiro NakaiKoi no series 4: Koi no Topping – Kouta JinnaiKoi no Annainin – Hirotaka TakaokaKoi no Karasawagi series – Takatoshi NishiharaKoi no Shinsatsushitsu 2 – Keigo YuukiKoishikute – Tomohiro HayamaKoisuru Jewelry Designer series 1 – Masaki KurakawaKoisuru Jewelry Designer series 2: Kare to Diamond – Masaki KurakawaKomatta Toki ni wa Hoshi ni Kike – Kiyomine HosakaKuroshitsuji – Sebastian MichaelisKyo Kara Maoh! – Conrad WellerLa Vie En Rose – Kouichi UtsukiMahou Gakuen series 1: Binetsu Club – WynnMahou Gakuen series 2: Himitsu Garden – WynnMahou Gakuen series 3: Mugen Palace – WynnMahou Gakuen series 4: Yuuwaku Lesson – WynnMahou Gakuen Series side story: Daiundoukai Zenyasai – WynnManatsu no Higaisha 1 & 2 – Ryuuichi OokuraMirage of Blaze series 4: Washi yo, Tarega Tameni Tobu – UmegiMo Dao Zu Shi/Ma Dou So Shi - Lan Xichen/Ran GishinMou Ichido Only You – Hiroto ArisaMunasawagi series – Yuuji TakanoMy Sexual Harassment series 2: Yume Kamoshirenai – Youhei FujitaMy Sexual Harassment series 3 – Youhei FujitaN-Dai Fuzoku Byouin series – Ryuuji ChinozakiNews Center no Koibito – Takeyuki JinnoOishii Karada – Yoshihisa AsakuraOnegai Darlin' – Hiroshi AiharaOre no Mono! – Yagami KatsuragiOsananajimi – YamazakiOtokogokoro – Hiroyasu SakiOtokonoko niwa Himitsu ga Aru – Kaguya TsukishiroOuchou Haru no Yoi no Romance – Moroe FujiwaranoPinky Wolf – Sou NishimoriPretty Babies – Kyouichi MikuniPretty Baby series 1 & 2 – Kiichi HiuraPunch Up! – Junsuke AkiRien no Kikoushi – Souichirou Tokiwa/Real name: TakamasaRijichou-sama no Okiniiri – Takamasa HayaseRossellini Ke no Musuko Ryakudatsusha – Leonardo RosselliniSaint Seiya – Leo AioliaSakurazawa vs Hakuhou series 1: Shokuinshitsu de Naisho no Romance – Toshiaki YaginumaSakurazawa vs Hakuhou series 2: Houkengo no Nayameru Kankei – Toshiaki YaginumaSamurai Shodown: Warriors Rage – HaomaruShiawase ni Dekiru series 1 - 5 – Yukihiko HondaShiawase ni Shite Agemasu – Aki ShinoharaShinsengumi Mokuhiroku Wasurenagusa – Yamazaki Susumu
Shiritsu Araiso Koto Gakko Seitokai Shikkobu – Makoto Kubota
Shiritsu Takizawa Koukou Seitokai – Keisuke Fujimoto
Shizuku Hanabira Ringo No Kaori – Shuusaku Nakagawa
Shosen Kedamono Series 1: Shosen Kedamono – Kyouichi Giou
Shosen Kedamono Series 2: Youko Nitsumaru – Kyouichi Giou
Shosen Kedamono Series 3: Ryuuou no Hanayome – Kyouichi Giou
Shosen Kedamono Series side story 1: Ryuuou no Hanayome Tokubetsuhen – Yuuya Momokawa
Shounen Yonkei
Slavers series – Takanari Saeki
Sono Kuchibiru ni Yoru no Tsuyu – Kyouichi Wakae
Soryamou Aideshou series 1 & 2 – Kazuhiro Hioki
Sugar Code – Oodoi
Super Lovers – Haru Kaido
Teito Shinshi Kurabu – Kouichirou Takaoka
Thanatos no Futago series 1: Thanatos no Futago 1912 – Viktor Ivanovich Kaverin
Thanatos no Futago series 2: Thanatos no Futago 1917 – Viktor Ivanovich Kaverin
Tora Nii-san to Wanko-san – Gintora
Tora-san to Ookami-san – Gintora
Touch Me Again – Takumi Sagata
Tsuki no Sabaku Satsujin Jiken – Natsuhiko Minowa
Tsumitsukuri na Kimi – Hiroshi Takamine
Wagamama Prisoner – Kyousuke Ikusawa
Wanko to Nyanko series – Atsushi Hasegawa
Wild Adapter – Makoto Kubota
Wild Rock – Emba
Yami no Matsuei series 1 – Seiichirou Tatsumi
Yami no Matsuei series 2: Summer Vacation – Seiichirou Tatsumi
Yome ni Konaika – Keigo Ikezaki
Yurigaoka Gakuen series 1: Heart mo Ace mo Boku no Mono – Riku Houjou
Yurigaoka Gakuen series 2: Kimidake no Prince ni Naritai – Riku Houjou, Kaname Matsumiya
Yuuwaku Recipe – Hongo
Ze – Shoi Mito
Zone-00-II section Knight – Renji Kurobara

Video games

Street Fighter Alpha – Charlie
Soul Edge – Heishirō Mitsurugi (Arcade Version)
Street Fighter Alpha 2 – Charlie
X-Men vs. Street Fighter – Charlie
Marvel Super Heroes vs. Street Fighter – Charlie
Rival Schools – Roberto Miura
Marvel vs. Capcom: Clash of Super Heroes – Ryu, Charlie
Street Fighter EX2 (1998) – Hayate
Tekken Tag Tournament – Hwoarang
Street Fighter EX2 Plus (1999, 2000) – Hayate
Marvel vs. Capcom 2: New Age of Heroes – Charlie, Hayato, Ryu [Shin Shoryuken battle cry]
Capcom vs. SNK: Millennium Fight 2000 – Ryu, Hon Fu
Capcom Fighting Jam – Ryu
Capcom vs. SNK 2: Millionaire Fighting 2001 – Ryu, Hon Fu
Tekken 4 – Hwoarang
Tekken Advance – Hwoarang
Kingdom Hearts – Sephiroth
Soulcalibur Legends – Heishirō Mitsurugi
Soulcalibur: Broken Destiny – Heishirō Mitsurugi
Granblue Fantasy – Seruel
Fire Emblem Heroes – Sigurd
Onmyōji (2018) – Minamoto no Yorimitsu
Promise of Wizard (2019) - Figaro Garcia
Touken Ranbu (2020) – Onimaru Kunitsuna
Shin Megami Tensei Nocturne HD Remaster (2020) – Dante (Maniax DLC)
Super Smash Bros. Ultimate (2020) – Sephiroth
Shin Megami Tensei V (2021) - Aogami
Fire Emblem Engage – Sigurd
Other Titles
Another Century's Episode 2 – Gen-Ichiro Tsukuomi
Another Century's Episode 3: The Final – Shagia Frost and Gen-Ichiro Tsukuomi
Another Century's Episode: R – Kyosuke Nanbu
Apocripha/0 – Jade Davis
Ar tonelico III – Hikari Gojo
Are you Alice? – White Knight
Assassin's Creed II (Japanese version) – Leonardo da Vinci
Assassin's Creed: Brotherhood (Japanese version) – Leonardo da Vinci
BioShock (Japanese version) – Atlas
Black Wolves Saga: Bloody Nightmare – Arles V. Felnoir
Black Wolves Saga: Last Hope – Arles V. Felnoir
Bleach: Soul Resurrección – Isshin Kurosaki
Bloody Call – Jin
Brave Story: New Traveler – Kee Keema
Diabolik Lovers ~Dark Fate~ – Carla Tsukinami
Everybody's Golf – Daryl
Final Fantasy Tactics Advance (Radio drama) – Adramelech
Front Mission 5: Scars of the War – Walter Feng
Gakuen Heaven – Nakajima Hideaki
God Eater 2 – Gilbert Mclane
Growlanser III: The Dual Darkness – Vincent Kreuzweir
Infamous Second Son – Reggie Rowe
Infinite Space – Yuri, the Man
Knuckle Heads – Takeshi Fujioka
Kyo Kara Maoh! Oresama Quest – Conrad Weller; PC version
Kyo Kara Maoh! Hajimari no Tabi – Conrad Weller; PlayStation 2 version
Lamento: Beyond the Void – Rai
Love 365: Star-Crossed Myth – Zyglavis
Naruto: Gekitō Ninja Taisen! 4 – Kimimaro
Naruto Shippūden: Gekitō Ninja Taisen! Special – Minato Namikaze
Naruto: Ultimate Ninja 3 – Kimimaro
Naruto Shippūden: Ultimate Ninja 4 – Kimimaro
Naruto Shippūden: Ultimate Ninja 5 – Kimimaro
Naruto Shippuden: Ultimate Ninja Heroes 3 – Minato Namikaze
Naruto Shippuden: Ultimate Ninja Impact – Minato Namikaze
Naruto: Ultimate Ninja Storm – Kimimaro
Naruto Shippuden: Ultimate Ninja Storm 2 – Minato Namikaze
Naruto Shippuden: Ultimate Ninja Storm Generations – Minato Namikaze, Kimimaro
Naruto Shippuden: Ultimate Ninja Storm 3 – Minato Namikaze
Naruto Shippuden: Ultimate Ninja Storm 4 – Minato Namikaze

One Piece: Gigant Battle 2 - Shinsekai – Enel
Persona 2: Eternal Punishment – Kei Nanjo
Plasma Sword: Nightmare of Bilstein – Hayato Kanzaki
Resident Evil: Operation Raccoon City – Leon S. Kennedy
Resident Evil: Revelations 2 – Leon S. Kennedy
Sengoku Basara series – Katakura Kojūrō
Silent Bomber – Jutah Fate
Spider-Man: Shattered Dimensions – Spider-Man Noir
Super Robot Wars Impact – Kyousuke Nanbu
Super Robot Wars Original Generations – Kyousuke Nanbu
Super Robot Wars Original Generation Gaiden – Kyousuke Nanbu
Super Smash Bros. Ultimate – Sephiroth
Taisen Puzzle-Dama – Ryo
Tales of Phantasia – Dhaos; Game Boy Advance and PlayStation Portable versions
Tales of Symphonia: Dawn of the New World – Yuan
Tales of Vesperia – Toki wo Kakeru Otoko
Tokimeki Memorial Girl's Side: 2nd Kiss – Wakaouji Takafumi
Tomb Raider: The Angel of Darkness (Japanese Edition) – Kurtis Trent
Vay – Heibelger / Sandor

Dubbing

Voice-doubles
Ewan McGregor
Little Voice – Billy
Rogue Trader – Nick Leeson
Star Wars: Episode I – The Phantom Menace – Obi-Wan Kenobi
Black Hawk Down – SPC John "Grimesey" Grimes
Star Wars: Episode II – Attack of the Clones – Obi-Wan Kenobi
Big Fish – Edward Bloom (young)
Star Wars: Episode III – Revenge of the Sith – Obi-Wan Kenobi
Stay – Dr. Sam Foster
Stormbreaker – Ian Rider
Incendiary – Jasper Black
Amelia – Gene Vidal
I Love You Phillip Morris – Phillip Morris
The Men Who Stare at Goats – Bob Wilton
Beginners – Oliver
The Ghost Writer – The Ghost
Nanny McPhee and the Big Bang – Rory Green
Haywire – Kenneth
Salmon Fishing in the Yemen – Alfred "Fred" Jones
The Impossible – Henry Bennett
Jack the Giant Slayer – Elmont
Son of a Gun – Brendan Lynch
Mortdecai – Inspector Martland
Star Wars: The Force Awakens – Obi-Wan Kenobi
Miles Ahead – Dave Braden
Jane Got a Gun – John Bishop
Zoe – Cole
Doctor Sleep – Danny Torrance
Star Wars: The Rise of Skywalker – Obi-Wan Kenobi
Birds of Prey – Roman Sionis / Black Mask
Staged – Ewan McGregor
Halston – Halston 
Obi-Wan Kenobi – Obi-Wan Kenobi
Raymond and Ray – Raymond
Pinocchio – Sebastian J. Cricket
Keanu Reeves
Chain Reaction (1999 TV Asahi edition) – Eddie Kasalivich
The Matrix (2002 Fuji TV edition) – Thomas Anderson/Neo
The Replacements – Shane Falco
The Watcher – David Allen Griffin
Sweet November – Nelson Moss
The Matrix Reloaded (2006 Fuji TV edition) – Thomas Anderson/Neo
The Matrix Revolutions (2007 Fuji TV edition) – Thomas Anderson/Neo
Constantine (2008 TV Asahi edition) – John Constantine
Thumbsucker – Dr. Perry Lyman
The Lake House – Alex Wyler
Street Kings – Detective Tommy "Tom" Ludlow
The Day the Earth Stood Still – Klaatu
Henry's Crime – Henry Torne
47 Ronin – Kai
John Wick – John Wick
Knock Knock – Evan Webber
Exposed – Detective Scott Galban
The Whole Truth – Richard Ramsay
The Bad Batch – the Dream
John Wick: Chapter 2 – John Wick
To the Bone – Dr. William Beckham
Destination Wedding – Frank
Replicas – William Foster
Siberia – Lucas Hill
Always Be My Maybe – Keanu Reeves
Between Two Ferns: The Movie – Keanu Reeves
John Wick: Chapter 3 – Parabellum – John Wick
Toy Story 4 – Duke Caboom
The SpongeBob Movie: Sponge on the Run – The Sage
Bill & Ted Face the Music – Theodore "Ted" Logan
Tom Cruise
Top Gun (2009 TV Tokyo edition) – Lt. Pete "Maverick" Mitchell
Born on the Fourth of July (2003 DVD edition) – Ron Kovic
Mission: Impossible (2003 TV Asahi edition) – Ethan Hunt
Eyes Wide Shut – Dr. William "Bill" Harford
Mission: Impossible 2 (2006 TV Asahi edition) – Ethan Hunt
The Last Samurai – Captain Nathan Algren
Collateral – Vincent
War of the Worlds – Ray Ferrier
Mission: Impossible III – Ethan Hunt
Lions for Lambs – Senator Jasper Irving
Tropic Thunder – Les Grossman
Valkyrie – Colonel Claus von Stauffenberg
Knight and Day – Roy Miller/Matthew Knight
Mission: Impossible – Ghost Protocol – Ethan Hunt
Jack Reacher – Jack Reacher
Oblivion – Commander Jack Harper
Edge of Tomorrow – Major William Cage
Mission: Impossible – Rogue Nation – Ethan Hunt
Jack Reacher: Never Go Back – Jack Reacher
The Mummy – Nick Morton
American Made – Barry Seal
Mission: Impossible – Fallout – Ethan Hunt
Top Gun: Maverick – Capt. Pete "Maverick" Mitchell
Adam Sandler
Billy Madison – Billy Madison
Happy Gilmore – Happy Gilmore
Bulletproof – Archie Moses
The Wedding Singer (In-flight edition) – Robbie Hart
Big Daddy – Sonny Koufax
Mr. Deeds – Longfellow Deeds
Punch-Drunk Love – Barry Egan
Anger Management – David "Dave" Buznik
50 First Dates – Henry Roth
Spanglish – John Clasky
The Longest Yard – Paul "Wrecking" Crewe
Click – Michael Newman
Bedtime Stories – Skeeter Bronson
You Don't Mess with the Zohan – Zohan Dvir
The Cobbler – Max Simkin
The Ridiculous 6 – Tommy "White Knife" Dunson Stockburn
The Do-Over – Max Kessler
Sandy Wexler – Sandy Wexler
The Meyerowitz Stories – Danny Meyerowitz
The Week Of – Kenny Lustig
Murder Mystery – Nick Spitz
Uncut Gems – Howard Ratner
Hubie Halloween – Hubie Dubois
Owen Wilson
Shanghai Noon – Roy O'Bannon
Zoolander – Hansel McDonald
Around the World in 80 Days (2008 TV Tokyo edition) – Wilbur Wright
Wedding Crashers – John Beckwith
Night at the Museum – Jedediah Smith
Marley & Me – John Grogan
Night at the Museum: Battle of the Smithsonian – Jedediah Smith
The Big Year – Kenny Bostick
Midnight in Paris – Gil Pender
The Internship – Nick Campbell
Night at the Museum: Secret of the Tomb – Jedediah Smith
No Escape – Jack Dwyer
Zoolander 2 – Hansel McDonald
Wonder – Nate Pullman
Marry Me – Charlie Gilbert
Jude Law
Cold Mountain – W. P. Inman
Sleuth – Milo Tindle
The Imaginarium of Doctor Parnassus – Imaginarium Tony 2
Sherlock Holmes – John Watson
Repo Men – Remy
Sherlock Holmes: A Game of Shadows – John Watson
Dom Hemingway – Dom Hemingway
Side Effects – Dr. Jonathan Banks
Spy – Bradley Fine
The Young Pope – Pope Pius XIII
Fantastic Beasts: The Crimes of Grindelwald – Albus Dumbledore
Captain Marvel – Yon-Rogg
The New Pope – Pope Pius XIII
Fantastic Beasts: The Secrets of Dumbledore – Albus Dumbledore
Martin Freeman
Sherlock – Dr. John Watson
The Hobbit: An Unexpected Journey – Bilbo Baggins
The Hobbit: The Desolation of Smaug – Bilbo Baggins
Fargo – Lester Nygaard
The Hobbit: The Battle of the Five Armies – Bilbo Baggins
The Eichmann Show – Milton Fruchtman
Captain America: Civil War – Everett K. Ross
Whiskey Tango Foxtrot – Iain MacKelpie
Cargo – Andy Rose
Ghost Stories – Mike Priddle
Black Panther – Everett K. Ross
Black Panther: Wakanda Forever – Everett K. Ross
Brendan Fraser
Encino Man – Linkovich "Link" Chomovsky
Airheads – Chester "Chaz Darby" Ogilvie
The Scout – Steve Nebraska
Dudley Do-Right – Dudley Do-Right
The Mummy – Richard "Rick" O'Connell
Bedazzled – Elliot Richards
Monkeybone – Stu Miley
The Mummy Returns – Richard "Rick" O'Connell
Looney Tunes: Back in Action – D.J. Drake
Journey to the End of the Night – Paul
The Mummy: Tomb of the Dragon Emperor – Richard "Rick" O'Connell
Mark Wahlberg
The Big Hit – Melvin Smiley
The Corruptor – Detective Danny Wallace
Planet of the Apes (2005 NTV edition) – Capt. Leo Davidson
The Italian Job – Charlie Croker
The Happening – Elliot Moore
The Fighter – Micky Ward
2 Guns – Michael "Stig" Stigman
The Gambler – Jim Bennett
Deepwater Horizon – Mike Williams
Uncharted – Victor "Sully" Sullivan
Paul Walker
The Fast and the Furious – Brian O'Conner
Joy Ride (2006 TV Tokyo edition) – Lewis Thomas
2 Fast 2 Furious – Brian O'Conner
Into the Blue – Jared
Flags of Our Fathers – Hank Hansen
The Death and Life of Bobby Z – Tim Kearney
The Lazarus Project – Ben Garvey
Brick Mansions – Damien Collier
Chris O'Donnell
The Three Musketeers (1998 TV Asahi edition) – D'Artagnan
Mad Love – Matt Leland
In Love and War – Ernest "Ernie" Hemingway
Batman & Robin (2000 TV Asahi edition) – Richard "Dick" Grayson/Robin
The Bachelor (2003 TV Asahi edition) – Jimmie Shannon
Cookie's Fortune – Jason Brown
NCIS: Los Angeles – G. Callen
Hawaii Five-0 – G. Callen
Josh Hartnett
Blow Dry – Brian Allen
Town & Country – Tom Stoddard
Sin City – The Salesman
The Black Dahlia – Dwight 'Bucky' Bleichert
30 Days of Night – Eben Oleson
August – Tom Sterling
Bunraku – The Drifter
Brad Pitt
The Favor (1999 TV Tokyo edition) – Elliot Fowler
Se7en (2001 TV Asahi edition) – Detective David Mills
The Devil's Own (2000 NTV and 2002 TV Asahi editions) – Francis Austin McGuire
Snatch (2017 Blu-ray edition) – 'One Punch' Mickey O'Neil
Spy Game (2005 TV Tokyo edition) – Tom Bishop
The Mexican (2004 TV Asahi edition) – Jerry Welbach
Burn After Reading – Chad Feldheimer
Heath Ledger
10 Things I Hate About You – Patrick Verona
The Four Feathers – Harry Faversham
Ned Kelly – Ned Kelly
Brokeback Mountain – Ennis del Mar
The Brothers Grimm – Jakob Grimm
The Imaginarium of Doctor Parnassus – Tony
Colin Farrell
American Outlaws – Jesse James
The Recruit – James Douglas Clayton
S.W.A.T. – Officer Jim Street
The Imaginarium of Doctor Parnassus – Imaginarium Tony 3
Total Recall – Douglas Quaid/Karl Hauser
Artemis Fowl – Artemis Fowl I
Joaquin Phoenix
Signs – Merrill Hess
It's All About Love – John
Ladder 49 – Jack Morrison
Hotel Rwanda – Jack Daglish
The Village – Lucius Hunt

Live-action
The Air Up There – Buddy Gibson (Keith Gibbs)
Alex Rider – Ian Rider (Andrew Buchan)
Alien: Covenant – Jacob Branson (James Franco)
Aliens (2003 DVD edition) – Corporal Dwayne Hicks (Michael Biehn)
Alien vs. Predator – Sebastian De Rosa (Raoul Bova)
Alita: Battle Angel – Dr. Dyson Ido (Christoph Waltz)
American Graffiti (2011 Blu-Ray edition) – Steve Bolander (Ron Howard)
The Andromeda Strain – Dr. Jeremy Stone (Benjamin Bratt)
Any Given Sunday (2004 TV Asahi edition) – "Steamin" Willie Beamen (Jamie Foxx)
Argo – Tony Mendez (Ben Affleck)
Armour of God – Alan (Alan Tam)
Assassination – Yem Sek-jin (Lee Jung-jae)
Awake – John Doe / Detective Michael Winslow (Jonathan Rhys Meyers)
Bachelor Party 2: The Last Temptation – Ron (Josh Cooke)
Bad Times at the El Royale – Billy Lee (Chris Hemsworth)
Bangkok Dangerous – Kong (Chakrit Yamnam)
Below (2005 TV Tokyo edition) – Ensign Douglas Odell (Matthew Davis)
Between Two Ferns: The Movie – Peter Dinklage
Big Trouble – Puggy (Jason Lee)
Black Dog (2002 NTV edition) – Sonny (Gabriel Casseus)
Black Rain (2008 DVD edition) – Detective Charlie Vincent (Andy García)
Boiling Point – Andy Jones (Stephen Graham)
Book of Shadows: Blair Witch 2 – Jeffrey Patterson (Jeffrey Donovan)
Blood and Wine – Jason (Stephen Dorff)
Blow – George "Boston George" Jung (Johnny Depp)
Bounce – Buddy Amaral (Ben Affleck)
Broadchurch – Detective Inspector Alec Hardy (David Tennant)
Brotherhood of Blades – Shen Lian (Chang Chen)
Brotherhood of Blades II: The Infernal Battlefield – Shen Lian (Chang Chen)
Cecil B. Demented – Sinclair/Cecil B. Demented (Stephen Dorff)
Con Air (2000 TV Asahi edition) – U.S. Marshal Vince Larkin (John Cusack)
Counterpart – Peter Quayle (Harry Lloyd)
Crouching Tiger, Hidden Dragon – Lo "Dark Cloud" (Chang Chen)
The Crow – Tin Tin (Laurence Mason)
Cruel Intentions – Ronald Clifford (Sean Patrick Thomas)
Cruel Intentions 3 – Jason Argyle (Kerr Smith)
Crossworlds – Steve (Jack Black)
Daddy Day Camp – Lance Warner (Lochlyn Munro)
Das Experiment – Tarek Fahd (Moritz Bleibtreu)
Deadwater Fell – Tom Kendrick (David Tennant)
Deep Impact – Dr. Oren Monash (Ron Eldard)
Deep Rising (2000 TV Asahi edition) – Billy (Clint Curtis)
The Defenders – Pete Kaczmarek (Jerry O'Connell)
Deliver Us from Evil – Butler (Joel McHale)
Dharma & Greg – Gregory "Greg" Clifford Montgomery (Thomas Gibson)
Dick – John Dean (Jim Breuer)
Don't Be Afraid of the Dark – Alex Hurst (Guy Pearce)
dot the i – Barnaby F. Caspian (James D'Arcy)
Dragon Blade – Captain (Xiao Yang)
Dragon Lord – Cowboy Chin (Mars)
Drop Dead Diva – Grayson Kent (Jackson Hurst)
Dune – Duke Leto Atreides (Oscar Isaac)
Edward Scissorhands (1994 TV Asahi edition) – Jim (Anthony Michael Hall)
ER – Chris Law (Joe Torry)
Evening – Harris Arden (Patrick Wilson)
The Evening Star – Bruce (Scott Wolf)
Executive Decision (1999 TV Asahi edition) – Master Sergeant Carlos "Rat" Lopez (John Leguizamo)
The Expendables 2 – Billy "The Kid" Timmons (Liam Hemsworth)
Eye of the Beholder (2004 TV Asahi edition) – Gary (Jason Priestley)
Fantastic Four (2008 NTV edition) – Reed Richards/Mr. Fantastic (Ioan Gruffudd)
Fight Club (2003 Fuji TV edition) – The Narrator (Edward Norton)
Fire Down Below (2000 TV Asahi edition) – Orin Hanner, Jr (Brad Hunt)
FlashForward – FBI Special Agent Mark Benford (Joseph Fiennes)
Flash Gordon – Flash Gordon (Eric Johnson)
Flightplan – Gene Carson (Peter Sarsgaard)
Flying Swords of Dragon Gate – Yu Huatian and Wind Blade (Chen Kun)
Friday Night Lights – Mike Winchell (Lucas Black)
Game of Thrones – Tyrion Lannister (Peter Dinklage)
The Game Plan – Kyle Cooper (Hayes MacArthur)
Gangs of New York – Amsterdam Vallon (Leonardo DiCaprio)
Georgia Rule – Simon Ward (Dermot Mulroney)
Ghostbusters – Kevin Beckman (Chris Hemsworth)
Girlfight – Adrian Sturges (Santiago Douglas)
Glee – Will Schuester (Matthew Morrison)
The Godfather (2008 Blu-ray and DVD editions) – Michael Corleone (Al Pacino)
The Godfather Part II (2008 Blu-ray and DVD editions) – Michael Corleone (Al Pacino)
Godzilla – Niko "Nick" Tatopolis (Matthew Broderick)
Gogol. The Beginning – Nikolai Vasilyevich Gogol (Alexander Petrov)
Gogol. Viy – Nikolai Vasilyevich Gogol (Alexander Petrov)
Gogol. Terrible Revenge – Nikolai Vasilyevich Gogol (Alexander Petrov)
Gone Girl – Nick Dunne (Ben Affleck)
Goodbye Christopher Robin – A. A. Milne (Domhnall Gleeson)
The Great Gatsby – Jay Gatsby (Robert Redford)
Gridlock'd – Ezekiel "Spoon" Whitmore (Tupac Shakur)
Guernica – Henry (James D'Arcy)
Harsh Times – Jim Davis (Christian Bale)
Heart and Souls – John McBride (Sean O'Bryan)
Heartbreakers – Jack Withrowe (Jason Lee)
Herbie: Fully Loaded – "Trip" Murphy (Matt Dillon)
His Dark Materials – Iorek Byrnison
Home Alone (1998 TV Asahi edition) – Buzz McCallister (Devin Ratray)
Home Alone 2: Lost in New York (1996 TV Asahi edition) – Buzz McCallister (Devin Ratray)
Home Alone 3 (2019 NTV edition) – Burton Jernigan (Lenny Von Dohlen)
The Hot Chick – Billy (Matthew Lawrence)
I Care a Lot – Roman Lunyov (Peter Dinklage)
I Know What You Did Last Summer (2000 TV Asahi edition) – Ray Bronson (Freddie Prinze, Jr.)
I Still Know What You Did Last Summer (2002 TV Asahi edition) – Ray Bronson (Freddie Prinze, Jr.)
The Imaginarium of Doctor Parnassus – Imaginarium Tony 1 (Johnny Depp)
The Incredible Hulk – Dr. Samuel Sterns (Tim Blake Nelson)
Independence Day – Captain Steven Hiller (Will Smith)
Iron Man 2 – Justin Hammer (Sam Rockwell)
Iron Will – Will Stoneman (Mackenzie Astin)
John Tucker Must Die – Scott Tucker (Penn Badgley)
K-19: The Widowmaker – Petty Officer Pavel Loktev (Christian Camargo)
Kate & Leopold (2006 NTV edition) – Charlie McKay (Breckin Meyer)
Keeping the Faith – Rabbi Jacob "Jake" Schram (Ben Stiller)
The King and the Clown – Jang-saeng (Kam Woo-sung)
Kinky Boots – Charlie Price (Joel Edgerton)
Knockaround Guys – Matty Demaret (Barry Pepper)
Last Days – Scott (Scott Patrick Green)
Legally Blonde (2005 NTV edition) – Emmett Richmond (Luke Wilson)
Legion – Gabriel (Kevin Durand)
Leonardo – Ludovico Sforza (James D'Arcy)
Life as We Know It – Eric Messer (Josh Duhamel)
Little House on the Prairie (2019 NHK BS4K edition) – Charles Ingalls (Michael Landon)
A Love Song for Bobby Long – Lawson Pines (Gabriel Macht)
Made in America – Tea Cake Walters (Will Smith)
A Man Apart (2007 TV Tokyo edition) – DEA Agent Demetrius Hicks (Larenz Tate)
Manifest – Benjamin "Ben" Stone (Josh Dallas)
Mars Attacks (2000 TV Tokyo edition) – Jason Stone (Michael J. Fox)
The Merchant of Venice – Bassanio (Joseph Fiennes)
Mermaids – Joe Porretti (Michael Schoeffling)
A Million Ways to Die in the West – Albert Stark (Seth MacFarlane)
Mindhunters – J.D. Reston (Christian Slater)
The Mists of Avalon – Lancelot (Michael Vartan)
Moonshot – Leon Kovi (Zach Braff)
Munich – Avner Kaufman (Eric Bana)
The Next Karate Kid – Eric McGowen (Chris Conrad)
Nick of Time – Gene Watson (Johnny Depp)
Night of the Living Dead – TV Newscaster (Charles Craig)
No Man's Land (1999 TV Tokyo edition) – Ted Varrick (Charlie Sheen)
Northern Exposure – Ed Chigliak (Darren E. Burrows)
The Notebook – Lon Hammond, Jr. (James Marsden)
October Sky – Jim Hickam (Scott Miles)
Painted Skin: The Resurrection – Huo Xin (Chen Kun)
Pawn Shop Chronicles – Richard (Matt Dillon)
Perfect Stranger – Miles Haley (Giovanni Ribisi)
Phat Girlz – Dr. Tunde Jonathan (Jimmy Jean-Louis)
Police – Charlie, Convict 999 (Charlie Chaplin)
Prison Break – James Whistler (Chris Vance)
Public Enemies – J. Edgar Hoover (Billy Crudup)
It's a Very Merry Muppet Christmas Movie – Daniel (David Arquette), Dr. John "J.D." Dorian (Zach Braff)
Redline – Carlo (Nathan Phillips)
Reindeer Games (2002 TV Asahi edition) – Nick Cassidy (James Frain)
Resident Evil: Retribution (2014 TV Asahi edition) – Leon S. Kennedy (Johann Urb)
Ride with the Devil – Jack Bull Chiles (Skeet Ulrich)
Rollerball – Jonathan Cross (Chris Klein)
Romeo + Juliet (2000 TV Asahi edition) – Tybalt Capulet (John Leguizamo)
Running Wild with Bear Grylls – Joel McHale
Sahara (2007 TV Tokyo edition) – Al Giordino (Steve Zahn)
Scary Movie – Ray Wilkins (Shawn Wayans)
Scary Movie 2 – Ray Wilkins (Shawn Wayans)
Scream – Stuart Macher (Matthew Lillard)
SEAL Team – Master Chief Special Warfare Operator Jason Hayes (David Boreanaz)
Sex Tape – Jay Hargrove (Jason Segel)
Shade – Vernon (Stuart Townsend)
Sidekicks – Randy Cellini (John Buchanan)
Simple Simon – Sam (Martin Wallström)
Sister Act 2: Back in the Habit (1997 NTV edition) – Frankie (Devin Kamin)
Sleepers – Thomas "Tommy" Marcano (Billy Crudup)
Sleepwalkers – Charles Brady (Brian Krause)
Son of the Mask (2009 NTV edition) – Loki (Alan Cumming)
Spartacus – Antoninus (Tony Curtis)
Speed Zone – Flash (Art Hindle)
Spider-Man 3 – Edward "Eddie" Brock/Venom (Topher Grace)
Spy Kids: All the Time in the World – Wilbur Wilson (Joel McHale)
Stand by Me – Ace Merrill (Kiefer Sutherland)
Star Trek: Voyager – Tom Paris (Robert Duncan McNeill)
Stealth – Henry Purcell (Jamie Foxx)
Streets of Blood – Detective Andy Devereaux (Val Kilmer)
Strictly Ballroom – Scott Hastings (Paul Mercurio)
Sunset Heat (1997 TV Tokyo edition) – David (Charlie Schlatter)
Survivor – Inspector Paul Anderson (James D'Arcy)
Taegukgi – Lee Jin-tae (Jang Dong-gun)
Team America: World Police – Gary Johnston (Trey Parker)
Terminal Velocity (1997 TV Asahi edition) – Robocam (Suli McCullough)
Tomorrowland – Hugo Gernsback (Keegan-Michael Key)
Top Gun (2005 DVD edition) – LT Tom "Iceman" Kazansky (Val Kilmer)
Trainspotting – Simon "Sick Boy" Williamson (Jonny Lee Miller)
T2 Trainspotting – Simon "Sick Boy" Williamson (Jonny Lee Miller)
The Tramp – The Tramp (Charlie Chaplin)
True Lies (1996 Fuji TV edition) – Faisal (Grant Heslov)
Ultraman: The Ultimate Hero – Kenichi Kai
Under Siege 2: Dark Territory (1998 TV Asahi edition) – Bobby Zachs (Morris Chestnut)
Unhook the Stars – Frankie Warren (David Thornton)
The Untamed (trailer only) – Lan Xichen (Liu Haikuan)
Up the Creek – Rex Crandall (Jeff East)
U.S. Marshals (2001 TV Asahi edition) – Special Agent John Royce (Robert Downey, Jr.)
Venom: Let There Be Carnage – Patrick Mulligan (Stephen Graham)
A Violent Prosecutor – Byun Jae-wook (Hwang Jung-min)
Volcano (2000 TV Asahi edition) – Emmit Reese (Don Cheadle)
We Were Soldiers – 2nd Lieutenant Jack Geoghegan (Chris Klein)
When in Rome – Nick Beamon (Josh Duhamel)
Where the Heart Is – Willy Jack Pickens (Dylan Bruno)
Wild Wild West – Captain Jim West (Will Smith)
Windtalkers – Private Ben Yahzee (Adam Beach)
Written on the Wind – Mitch Wayne (Rock Hudson)
Young Detective Dee: Rise of the Sea Dragon – Doctor Wáng Pu (Chen Kun)
The Young Victoria – Sir Robert Peel (Michael Maloney)
Zapped Again! – Cecil (David Dohan)
Zhong Kui: Snow Girl and the Dark Crystal – Zhong Kui (Chen Kun)

Animation
The Addams Family 2 – Cyrus Strange
Adventure Time – Marshall Lee
Bad Cat – Riza
The Boss Baby – Captain Ross
A Christmas Carol – Fred Scrooge
Cloudy with a Chance of Meatballs – Officer Earl Devereaux
Horton Hears A Who! – Horton the Elephant
Isle of Dogs – Spots
The Lego Movie – Emmet Brickowski, Superman, Han Solo
The Lego Movie 2: The Second Part – Emmet Brickowski, Rex Dangervest
Raya and the Last Dragon – Chief Benja
Walking with Dinosaurs – Scowler
What If...? – Tony Stark / Iron Man
Wonder Park – Peanut
Zootopia – Nicholas P. "Nick" Wilde

References

External links

 
Toshiyuki Morikawa at seiyuu.info
Toshiyuki Morikawa at GamePlaza-Haruka Voice Acting Database 
Toshiyuki Morikawa at Hitoshi Doi's Seiyuu Database

1967 births
Living people
Japanese company founders
Japanese male pop singers
Japanese male video game actors
Male voice actors from Tokyo
Singers from Tokyo
20th-century Japanese male actors
21st-century Japanese businesspeople
21st-century Japanese male actors
20th-century Japanese male singers
20th-century Japanese singers
21st-century Japanese male singers
21st-century Japanese singers